The 2010 A-League Grand Final took place at Etihad Stadium in Melbourne, Australia on 20 March 2010.

It was the final match in the A-League 2009–10 season, and was played between premiers Sydney FC and runners-up Melbourne Victory. Sydney FC won the match 4–2 on penalty shootout after drawing the game 1–1 and became the winners of the 2009–10 Championship in addition to their premiership.

The A-League National Youth League Grand Final was held at Etihad Stadium prior to the main game. After coming 4th in the 2009–10 season, Gold Coast United won the youth title in their inaugural season, coming from a goal down to defeat Perth Glory, 2–1.

Route to the final

Match

Summary
An early knee injury forced key striker Archie Thompson, who scored 5 goals in the 2007 A-League Grand Final, off the field in the sixteenth minute. He was replaced by Costa Rican Marvin Angulo.

With both teams struggling to break the deadlock, Melbourne were left stunned when Mark Bridge scored a goal in the 63rd minute after a deflected cross. To add to Melbourne's misfortune, it was scored less than a minute after Rodrigo Vargas' headed goal was correctly disallowed by the assistant referee for offside.

Melbourne were able to find an equaliser through Adrian Leijer after Kevin Muscat delivered a set piece. Leijer's late header resulted in some frantic final minutes, but neither team were able to find the breakthrough goal in normal time. Extra time resulted in few opportunities and the game was decided by penalties for the first time in A-League history.

Details

Statistics

See also
 2009–10 A-League
 List of A-League champions

References

External links
 Official A-League Website

1
A-League Men Grand Finals
Melbourne Victory FC matches
Sydney FC matches
A-League Grand Final 2010